is a railway station on the Nippō Main Line operated by Kyūshū Railway Company in Hiji, Ōita, Japan.

Lines

Layout 
The station consists of an island platform serving two tracks at grade. The station building is a modern concrete structure which houses an enclosed waiting room and a staffed ticket window. Access to the island platform is by means of a level crossing with steps at both ends.

Management of the station has been outsourced to the JR Kyushu Tetsudou Eigyou Co., a wholly owned subsidiary of JR Kyushu specialising in station services. It staffs the ticket booth which is equipped with a POS machine but does not have a Midori no Madoguchi facility.

Adjacent stations

History
Japanese National Railways (JNR) opened the station on 1 June 1952 as an additional station on the existing track of the  Nippō Main Line. With the privatization of JNR on 1 April 1987, the station came under the control of JR Kyushu.

Passenger statistics
In fiscal 2016, the station was used by an average of 481 passengers daily (boarding passengers only), and it ranked 248th among the busiest stations of JR Kyushu.

See also
List of railway stations in Japan

References

External links

  

Railway stations in Ōita Prefecture
Railway stations in Japan opened in 1952